Amir Salman Shahrukh (Stars: Aamir Khan Salman Khan Shah Rukh Khan) is a Bollywood comedy film produced by Raju Rahikwar, lookalike of the king of Bollywood Shah Rukh Khan. It introduces Raju Rahikwar as an actor who is already famous as the lookalike of Shah Rukh Khan. There shown all the lookalikes of Bollywood stars in this film in which 3 in the lead first Raju as Shahrukh Khan and Sagar Pandey as Salman Khan and Dewashish Ghosh as Aamir Khan. This Film Introduced 3 New Actors Of Bollywood As Their First Film Raju Rahikwar, Sagar Pandey, Dewashish Ghosh.

Cast
Raju Rahikwar as Shah Rukh Khan
Sagar Pandey as Salman Khan
Dewashish Ghosh as Aamir Khan

Plot
Three babies are born to a mother in a single time and at the young age they look like the stars of Bollywood Shah Rukh Khan, Salman Khan and Aamir Khan.

Songs

References

External links
 

2010s Hindi-language films
Films set in Mumbai
Hindi-language comedy films